The 1997 Plymouth City Council election took place on 1 May 1997 to elect members of Plymouth City Council in Devon, England. This was on the same day as other local elections. The Labour Party retained control of the council, which it had held since 1991.

Overall results

|-
| colspan=2 style="text-align: right; margin-right: 1em" | Total
| style="text-align: right;" | 60
| colspan=5 |
| style="text-align: right;" | 133,521
| style="text-align: right;" |

Ward results

Budshead (3 seats)

Compton (3 seats)

Drake (3 seats)

Efford (3 seats)

Eggbuckland (3 seats)

Estover (3 seats)

Ham (3 seats)

Honicknowle (3 seats)

Keyham (3 seats)

Mount Gould (3 seats)

Plympton Erle (3 seats)

Plympton St Mary (3 seats)

Plymstock Dunstone (3 seats)

Plymstock Radford (3 seats)

Southway (3 seats)

St Budeax (3 seats)

St Peter (3 seats)

Stoke (3 seats)

Sutton (3 seats)

Trelawny (3 seats)

References

1997 English local elections
May 1997 events in the United Kingdom
1997
1990s in Devon